Guillermo Estrella Tolentino (July 24, 1890 – July 12, 1976) was a Filipino sculptor and professor of the University of the Philippines. He was designated as a National Artist of the Philippines for Sculpture in 1973, three years before his death.

Early life and education
Tolentino was born on July 24, 1890 in Malolos, Bulacan. He was the fourth child in his family and had seven siblings. Before being interested in sculptures, he learned how to play the guitar, a skill which he inherited from his father. The young Tolentino showed an early talent in sculpting, having been able to mold figures of horses and dogs out of clay.

Tolentino started studying in Malolos Intermediate School and continued his high school years in the same city. After studying in Malolos, Tolentino went to Manila and attended classes in the School of Fine Arts of the University of the Philippines.

In 1911, Tolentino made an illustration of prominent Filipinos posing for a studio portrait. Among those included were national heroes, revolutionaries, and politicians. The illustration was lithographed and published in a weekly magazine called Liwayway under the name "Grupo de Filipinos Ilustres" and became popular among homes in the 20th century. Tolentino, a student at the university when he made the illustration, didn't earn any money from it but didn't seem to mind about it.

Tolentino graduated in 1915 with a degree in Fine Arts.

Career

Tolentino, upon returning from Europe in 1925, was appointed as a professor at the University of the Philippines' School of Fine Arts and opened his studio in Manila on January 24.

Along with thirteen artists, Tolentino joined a contest in 1930 to design the Bonifacio Monument. Instead of basing the statues on printed materials, he interviewed people who participated in the Philippine Revolution. Bonifacio's figure was based on the bone structure of Espiridiona Bonifacio, the Supremo's surviving sister. Down to seven entries, the committee had its winners by July 29. Tolentino's entry won first place and was given a cash prize of 3,000 pesos.

In 1935, Rafael Palma, president of the University of the Philippines, commissioned Tolentino to sculpt the Oblation, a statue based on the second stanza of Jose Rizal's Mi ultimo adios. Tolentino used concrete to create the statue but it was painted to look like bronze. The statue's model was Anastacio Caedo, his assistant, whose physique was combined with the proportion of Virgilio Raymundo, his brother-in-law.

The University of the Philippines Alumni Association requested Tolentino on October 25, 1935 to construct an arch commemorating the inauguration of the Commonwealth of the Philippines but it was never built, because of the war.

In the absence of Fernando Amorsolo, Tolentino was appointed acting director of the School of Fine Arts and eventually became its director two years later, on August 4, 1953.

Besides monuments, Tolentino made smaller sculptures, which are now located in the National Museum of Fine Arts and busts of heroes at the Malacañang Palace. He also designed the medals of the Ramon Magsaysay Award and the seal of the Republic of the Philippines.

Later years
In 1955, Tolentino retired from service in the University of the Philippines and returned to private practice. He received various awards and distinctions in his later years, most notably his declaration as National Artist by Ferdinand Marcos on May 15, 1973.

Death
Tolentino died at 8:00 p.m. on July 12, 1976 at his house in Retiro Street, Quezon City, twelve days before his 86th birthday. He was interred at the Libingan ng mga Bayani, which was part of his privileges as a national artist.

Awards and exhibitions

These were the awards given to Guillermo Tolentino:

 1959 – UNESCO Cultural Award in Sculpture
 1963 – Patnubay ng Sining at Kalinangan Award
 1967 – Republic Cultural Heritage Award
 1970 – Presidential Medal of Merit
 1972 – Diwa ng Lahi Award
 1973 – National Artist of the Philippines for Visual Arts in Sculpture

Exhibitions at the National Art Gallery
Guillermo Tolentino's works and memorabilia are mainly housed in Gallery XII or Security Bank Hall of the National Museum of Fine Arts. This was possible with the collaboration of his family, Security Bank president Frederick Dy, Judy Araneta-Roxas, Ernesto and Araceli Salas, and Nestor Jordin.

Works relating to Jose Rizal by Tolentino and other Filipino artists of the 20th century are displayed at Gallery V of the museum.

References

1890 births
1976 deaths
Filipino sculptors
People from Malolos
University of the Philippines alumni
National Artists of the Philippines
Burials at the Libingan ng mga Bayani
Recipients of the Presidential Medal of Merit (Philippines)